Kongtong may refer to:

Kongtong District, district in Gansu, China
Kongtong Mountains, sacred mountain of Taoism, in Gansu, China
Kongtong, Mawkmai, Shan State, Burma